The tule bluet (Enallagma carunculatum) is a species of damselfly in the family Coenagrionidae found in North America, from northern Mexico to southern Canada.

Identification 
The damselfly has a blue and black abdomen, usually with more black than blue. The black humeral stripes are about a half the width of the blue antehumerals. The tule bluet postocular spots are small and triangular; they are separated by a thin occipital bar.

Size 

Distribution 
The tule bluet is found throughout the United States, except for the southeastern quarter and many portions of southern Canada.

Habitat 
The following is the list of habitats of the tule bluet.
rivers
lakes
ponds
marshes
bogs
They occur where there are bulrushes around.

Flight season 
Mid-May to mid-September. It can also be during early July to mid-October.

Diet 
Nymphs: nymphs eat a large variety of aquatic insects, they include mosquito larvae, mayfly larvae, and other aquatic insect larvae.
Adults: adult tule bluet feed on a wide variety small flying insects, mayflies, flies, small moths, and mosquitoes. They sometimes pick up small insects from plants like aphids.

Ecology 
The tule bluet is found almost always where there are extensive stands of tules. This is how this bluet gets its common name. The damselfly will emerge from relatively deep water if there are bulrushes nearby. The tule bluet can be also found in alkaline or salty water.

Reproduction 
The male damselflies set up territories at choice breeding sites. After males and females have mated, the male stays attached to the female, as she oviposits in the stems of bulrushes. They are in their tandem position.

Conservation 
The populations of the tule bluet are widespeard, abundant, and secure.

References 

Tule Bluet
Greg Lasley's North American Dragonflies and Damselflies
Tule Bluet - Enallagma carunculatum
Damselfly - Enallagma carunculatum - BugGuide.Net
 Lam, E. (2004) Damselflies of the Northeast. Forest Hills, NY:Biodiversity Books. p. 65.

Coenagrionidae
Odonata of North America
Insects of Canada
Insects of Mexico
Insects of the United States
Fauna of the Eastern United States
Fauna of the Western United States
Insects described in 1895